Pogorelets is a rural locality (a village) in Rezhskoye Rural Settlement, Syamzhensky District, Vologda Oblast, Russia. The population was 8 as of 2002.

Geography 
Pogorelets is located 34 km northeast of Syamzha (the district's administrative centre) by road. Slobodka is the nearest rural locality.

References 

Rural localities in Syamzhensky District